Hestinalis is a genus of butterflies in the family Nymphalidae. Some authors consider Hestinalis and Hestina as one genus.

References 

Apaturinae
Nymphalidae genera